The 2012–13 season was Shrewsbury's first season back in League One following promotion from League Two the previous season. They also participated in the FA Cup, the Football League Trophy and the League Cup.

Season review

Shrewsbury entered the League Cup at the first round stage, but were knocked out by Leeds United after losing 4–0. 
They entered the Football League Trophy at the second round stage on 9 October 2012, and where beaten at home by Crewe Alexandra 1–2. They entered the FA Cup at the second round stage on 3 November away to Hereford United.

Transfers

In

Loans In

Out

Released

Squad

Friendly matches

Competitions

League One

League table

Results

FA Cup

Football League Cup

Football League Trophy

Squad statistics

Appearances and goals

|-
|colspan="14"|Players away from the club on loan:
|-
|colspan="14"|Players who appeared for Shrewsbury no longer at the club:

|}

Top scorers

Updated 16 January 2013

Disciplinary record

References 

Shrewsbury Town F.C. seasons
Shrewsbury Town